The Fool's Revenge is a 1916 American silent drama film directed by Will S. Davis and starring William H. Tooker, Richard Neill and Ruth Findlay.

Cast
 William H. Tooker as Anson 
 Maude Gilbert as Anson's Wife 
 Ruth Findlay as Ethel - Anson's Daughter 
 Richard Neill as Randall
 Warner Oland 
 Kittens Reichert as Ethel - as a Child

References

Bibliography
 Solomon, Aubrey. The Fox Film Corporation, 1915-1935: A History and Filmography. McFarland, 2011.

External links
 
 

1916 films
1916 drama films
1910s English-language films
American silent feature films
Silent American drama films
Films directed by Will S. Davis
American black-and-white films
Fox Film films
1910s American films